Ivan Bratko (15 February 1914 – 23 March 2001) was a Slovene writer and publisher, partisan and officer.

Bratko was born in Celje in 1914. He graduated in law from the University of Ljubljana in 1941. He was a member of the League of Communists of Yugoslavia from 1933 and published numerous articles and columns on socio-economic matters even before the Second World War. He was interred at Gonars concentration camp from where he escaped and joined the partisan. His escape from Gonars was also the inspiration for his best known book Teleskop (Telescope), for which he won the Levstik Award in 1954. From 1952 until his retirement in 1981 he worked as head of the DZS Publishing House.

He died in Ljubljana in 2001.

Bibliography

 S poti po evropskem zapadu (On the Road in Western Europe), 1950
 Teleskop (Telescope), novel, 1954
 Pomlad v februarju (Spring in February), novel, 1957
 Vroči asfalt Evrope (The Hot Asphalt of Europe), short stories, 1962
 Rakete in sekvoje (Rockets and Sequoias), travelogue, 1965
 Dekletov dnevnik (A Girl's Diary), 1969
 Čas knjige (The Time of the Book), 1972
 Okrogla miza (Round Table), 1977

References

Writers from Celje
Yugoslav Partisans members
1914 births
2001 deaths
Levstik Award laureates
Ethnic Slovene people
University of Ljubljana alumni